Goesan Pi clan was one of the Korean clans. Their Bon-gwan was in Goesan County, North Chungcheong Province. According to the research in 2000, the number of Goesan Pi clan was 2204. He served as Jinzi Guanglu Daifu in Yuan dynasty. He made Toghon Temür furious because he lost war. As a result, he exiled himself with his family. Goesan Pi clan was begun after Gongmin of Goryeo appointed  as Prince of Goesan.

See also 
 Korean clan names of foreign origin

References

External links 
 

 
Korean clan names of Chinese origin